Baruva is a village and a beach resort located near Sompeta in Srikakulam district, Andhra Pradesh, India. The Mahendratanaya River merges into the Bay of Bengal at this place. This village is situated at a distance of 109 KM from Srikakulam town, the district headquarters.

Baruva was used as a seaport in the era of British colonial rule in India up to 1948. In July, 1917, a ship carrying goods sank in the sea. To commemorate this incident a pillar was constructed. The harbor is closed, but the old lighthouse stood until 2000.

Tourism

 The swampy sea shore, locally called "beela", is well known for duck shooting and fishing.
 The famous Sri Kotilingeswara Swamy and Janardhana Swamy temples are here.
 The river Mahendra Tanya merges into sea at this place. Thousands of people take sea bath during festival days, especially in "Karthikam" (November–December) every year.
 Baruva was once a seaport. Two obelisks, one white and the other black, of fifty feet height above the sea level, mark the seaport.
 The large grooves of coconut trees and green paddy fields make the place picturesque.

Transport
Baruva railway station is located on Howrah-Chennai mainline. Passenger trains that run from Palasa towards Khurda Road station halt at Baruva station.

References 

Villages in Srikakulam district
Maritime history of India